Sony Pictures Television Kids (formerly known as Silvergate Media), is a television production and brand licensing company based in New York City and London. The company was founded in 2011 by Waheed Alli and was acquired by Sony Pictures Television in 2019.

History 
Silvergate Media was created in 2011 as part of a management buyout, when Alli purchased the rights to Octonauts and The World of Beatrix Potter from Chorion, a company he was previously chair of. 

In 2016, Netflix and Silvergate agreed to a three-year multi-territory deal for Octonauts, Silvergate's series about underwater explorers.

The company signed a deal with Netflix, in collaboration with Mercury Filmworks to produce Hilda, an animated television adaptation of comic Hilda by Luke Pearson. Season 1 was released on September 21, 2018. Season 2 was released on December 14, 2020. The series is available in 130 countries. 

Silvergate also produced Sunny Day for Nickelodeon, which started airing on August 21, 2017.

In 2016, the investment fund Shamrock Capital Advisors acquired a 51% equity of the company, with the valuation reported to be "between £70 and £80 million".

On December 10, 2019, Sony Pictures Television announced that it would acquire Silvergate Media for US$195 million. The deal marks SPT's first in-house studio devoted primarily to children's animation since Sony Pictures Animation's diversification into television. The company quietly changed its name to Sony Pictures Television Kids in 2022.

Filmography

Television series

Feature film

References

Television production companies of the United Kingdom
British companies established in 2011
Mass media companies established in 2011
Sony Pictures Entertainment
Sony Pictures Television
Sony Pictures Television production companies
2019 mergers and acquisitions
British subsidiaries of foreign companies
Mass media companies based in London
2011 establishments in England
Mass media companies based in New York City
2011 establishments in New York City